The year 2006 is the 5th year in the history of the Maximum Fighting Championship, a mixed martial arts promotion based in Canada. In 2006 Maximum Fighting Championship held 3 events beginning with, MFC 9: No Excuses.

Title fights

Events list

MFC 9: No Excuses

MFC 9: No Excuses was an event held on March 10, 2006 at the Shaw Conference Centre in Edmonton, Alberta, Canada.

Results

MFC 10: Unfinished Business

MFC 10: Unfinished Business was an event held on September 8, 2006 at the Shaw Conference Centre in Edmonton, Alberta, Canada.

Results

MFC: Unplugged 2

MFC: Unplugged 2 was an event held on November 10, 2006 at the Crowne Plaza Edmonton in Edmonton, Alberta, Canada.

Results

See also 
 List of Maximum Fighting Championship events

References

Maximum Fighting Championship events
2006 in mixed martial arts
Events in Edmonton